Stefan Edberg and Anders Järryd were the defending champions, but Edberg did not participate this year.  Järryd partnered with Guy Forget, losing in the semifinals.

Boris Becker and Slobodan Živojinović won the title, defeating John Fitzgerald and Tomáš Šmíd 7–6, 7–5 in the final.

Seeds

  Guy Forget /  Anders Järryd (semifinals)
  Joakim Nyström /  Mats Wilander (first round)
  Mark Edmondson /  Kim Warwick (first round)
  John Fitzgerald /  Tomáš Šmíd (final)

Draw

Draw

References
Draw

1986 Grand Prix (tennis)
Donnay Indoor Championships